Benjamin Todd Fricke (November 3, 1975 – February 21, 2011) was an American football center in the National Football League (NFL) for the Dallas Cowboys. He also was a member of the Amsterdam Admirals in NFL Europe. He played college football at the University of Houston.

Early years
Fricke attended Anderson High School, where he was an All-district selection on both offense and defense as a sophomore and junior. He was switched to center as a senior and was the team's punter. He also practiced track.

He received a football scholarship from the University of Houston to play as a defensive lineman. He was moved to center and became a four-year starter and an All-American. He did not allow a sack as a senior.

Professional career

New York Giants
Fricke was selected by the New York Giants in the seventh round (213th overall) of the 1998 NFL Draft, after dropping because he was considered undersized for the position. He was waived on August 23.

Amsterdam Admirals (NFLE)
In 1999, he was selected by the Amsterdam Admirals in the 11th round of the NFL Europe draft. He was the starter at center, helping running back David Thompson finish fourth in the league with 503 rushing yards.

Dallas Cowboys
On August 2, 1999, he signed as a free agent with the Dallas Cowboys, to provide depth in training camp because of injuries. He was cut on September 22. He was re-signed on October 5. He was released on October 27 and signed to the practice squad the next day. He was promoted to the active roster on November 19. He appeared in 3 games and was declared inactive in 4 contests.

In 2000, he was declared inactive in 7 of the first 9 games. He started five games at center in place of Mark Stepnoski, who suffered a sprained MCL in his left knee in the eleventh game against the Baltimore Ravens. In 2001, he was tried at long snapper during training camp to replace the recently released Dale Hellestrae, but remained as a backup at center, appearing in 7 games. He was cut on June 13, 2002.

San Francisco 49ers
In June 2002, he was signed by the San Francisco 49ers. He was released on August 8.

Personal life
Fricke was an assistant football coach at Centennial High School. On February 21, 2011, he died at the age of 35 from colon cancer.

References

External links
 

1975 births
2011 deaths
American football centers
American football offensive guards
Amsterdam Admirals players
Dallas Cowboys players
Houston Cougars football players
High school football coaches in Texas
Players of American football from Austin, Texas
Deaths from colorectal cancer
Deaths from cancer in Texas